The 2016 Carleton Ravens football team represented Carleton University in the 2016 CIS football season. The Ravens played in their 55th season overall and their fourth season of Canadian Interuniversity Sport play after a 15-year hiatus.

Carleton had a fairly successful season, finishing the regular season with a 6–2 record, 4th in the OUA. This gave the Ravens the right to host their first playoff game since 1986, against their cross-town rivals, the Ottawa Gee-Gees. They would then go on to lose in the semifinal against Western. The Ravens finished the season ranked 8th in the country, and had a peak ranking of 4th after week 3.

Roster

Exhibition

Regular season and playoffs
The Ravens played an 8-game regular season schedule, playing all but two OUA football teams, the Guelph Gryphons and the Queen's Golden Gaels.

Schedule

Game Summaries

Vs. McMaster

Vs. Western

Vs. Toronto

Vs. Laurier

Vs. York

Vs. Ottawa

Vs. Windsor

Vs. Waterloo

OUA Playoff Quarterfinal vs. Ottawa

This marked Carleton's first home playoff game since 1986 and their first playoff match against their cross-town rivals since 1996 and their third overall playoff meeting against the Gee-Gees.

OUA Playoff Semifinal vs. Western

References

2016 in Canadian football
Carleton Ravens football seasons
Carleton Ravens football